Boharigau  is a village development committee in Darchula District in Sudurpashchim Province of western Nepal. At the time of the 1991 Nepal census it had a population of 3262 people living in 572 individual households.

References

External links
UN map of the municipalities of Darchula District

Populated places in Darchula District